Middlehill is a hamlet in the parish of St Ive and Pensilva, Cornwall, England.

References

Hamlets in Cornwall